Alan Obst is an Australian rules football player who played for  in the Australian Football League (AFL) and Central District in the South Australian National Football League (SANFL).

Originally from the South Gawler Football Club, Obst played for South Australia at the 2005 AFL Under 18 Championships.

Obst made his AFL debut in Round 8 of the 2008 AFL season, two days before his 21st birthday.  He was badly injured from a collision during the game.  He fractured ribs and suffered a collapsed lung, resulting in him being unable to fly home from the Gold Coast and instead was driven home.  He return later in the year to play two more games, but was delisted again at the end of the season.  North Melbourne then re-selected him in the 2009 Rookie Draft.  He only played in the final two matches of the 2009 AFL season and not at all in 2010, before he was delisted from an AFL club for the third time in October 2010.

In 2011 he returned to South Australia to again play for Central District.

Obst has twice suffered injuries from late-night incidents at bars, firstly in May 2010 in Melbourne and then in April 2011 in Adelaide, when he received a broken jaw.

References

External links

North Melbourne Football Club players
Central District Football Club players
Werribee Football Club players
Living people
1987 births
Australian rules footballers from South Australia
Darwin Football Club players
North Adelaide Football Club players